Bob Sullivan may refer to:

 Bob Sullivan (American football) (1923–1981), walk-on offensive half back and defensive back
 Bob Sullivan (basketball) (1921–2007), American professional basketball player
 Bob Sullivan (ice hockey) (1957–2018), former professional ice hockey player
 Bob Sullivan (journalist) (born 1968), American online journalist
 Bob Sullivan (rugby league) (1931–2009), Australian rugby league footballer

See also
Robert Sullivan (disambiguation)